Sariyeh Khatun (also Romanized as Sārīyeh Khātūn; also known as Emāmzādeh, Emāmzādeh Sārīyeh Khātūn, and Imāmzādeh) is a village in Neyzar Rural District, Salafchegan District, Qom County, Qom Province, Iran. At the 2006 census, its population was 85, in 25 families.

References 

Populated places in Qom Province